A list of films produced in France in 1982.

See also
1982 in France
1982 in French television

Notes

External links
 French films of 1982 at the Internet Movie Database
French films of 1982 at Cinema-francais.fr

1982
Films
French